Paul Schäfer (born 18 January 1949 in Mainz) is a German politician and diplomat. 
In 1978 he received a diploma in sociology.
From 1983 to 1990 he was editor of the magazine Wissenschaft und Frieden ('Science and Peace').

Political life
He is the deputy for Die Linkspartei.
From 1970 to 1988 he was a member of the DKP, then from 1993 to 1999 he was a member of the SPD. In 2000 he joined the PDS (now 'Die Linkspartei'). He has been regional chairman for the party in North Rhine-Westphalia since May 2003, and a member of the party's executive committee since October 2004. In the 2005 federal election he was elected to the Bundestag on the party list for North Rhine-Westphalia.

External links

List of Left Party deputies with profiles (in German)
Paul Schäfer's Website (in German)

1949 births
Living people
German Communist Party members
Politicians from Mainz
Members of the Bundestag for North Rhine-Westphalia
Social Democratic Party of Germany politicians
The Left (Germany) politicians
Members of the Bundestag 2009–2013
Members of the Bundestag 2005–2009
Members of the Bundestag for the Party of Democratic Socialism (Germany)